The British Lung Foundation (BLF) is a British charity that promotes lung health and supports those affected by lung disease.

History 
The British Lung Foundation was established by Professor Sir Malcolm Green and a group of United Kingdom lung specialists in 1984. It has maintained strong links with the medical profession, as well as utilising the talents of people from all walks of life who share a determination to try to conquer lung disease in the 21st Century.

Breathe Easy 
Breathe Easy is the support network of the British Lung Foundation. The network includes 150 support groups across the UK. Breathe Easy supports people through regular group meetings and offering help over the phone. There is also a pen-pal scheme, enabling people to make contact with others in the same situation. After a Breathe Easy campaign the Department of Health decided to undertake a complete review of the way oxygen is provided in England and Wales.

Campaigns 
The British Lung Foundation campaigns for improvements in all areas of lung health. Breathe Easy supporters and members of the general public have worked with the BLF to ensure that these issues remain on the agenda at Westminster - and in the political chambers of Northern Ireland, Scotland and Wales.
The BLF also campaigns to raise public awareness of lung disease and the impact it has on so many lives through poster campaigns, events and by maintaining a media profile.

Controversy 

In June 2012 the British Lung Foundation released a report looking at the health impacts of smoking cannabis.  (The report since appears to have been withdrawn.) In one section, the report claimed "each cannabis cigarette increases the chances of developing lung cancer by as much as an entire packet of 20 tobacco cigarettes", and the claim received prominence in launch interviews with the then chief executive, Dame Helena Shovelton.  The report supported the claim by reference to a 2008 study, "Cannabis use and risk of lung cancer: a case-control study" (Aldington et al.), published in the European Respiratory Journal.  That study had been challenged within the year and in the same journal, long before the BLF's claim.

In a BBC radio interview on the day of the launch, Kevin Williamson, author of "Drugs and the Party line", said that there was "no scientific basis to the claim", citing an earlier study of 2200 people published in Cancer Epidemiological Biomarkers and Prevention that had found "that the association of these cancers with marijuana, even long-term or heavy use, is not strong and may be below practically detectable limits", asking the charity's representative to cite the research that supported the charity's claim. When he declined to do so, Williamson accused the charity of "putting out bogus information" for "headline grabbing".  On the same day, online journalist Keelan Balderson  accused the charity of peddling "a long debunked myth".  He claimed that it was not the first such incident, citing an earlier BLF statement that "3 joints are equal to 20 cigarettes", taken from the BLF’s 2002 Smoking Gun? report.  David Nutt criticised the Foundation for "scaremongering".  Peter Reynolds, leader of the political party Cannabis Law Reform, described the report as a "dangerously irresponsible mix of conjecture, extremist opinion and scaremongering".

The British Lung Foundation responded by asserting that the report was based on sound research, and "references over 80 peer-reviewed research papers, is the most comprehensive report of its kind yet compiled, and has itself been peer-reviewed by independent experts".

Research 
On average, the British Lung Foundation invests one million pounds a year in research projects aiming to improve the diagnosis or treatment of lung conditions. 
As a direct result of research funded by the BLF, it is now possible to measure lung capacity in infants; the benefits of pulmonary rehabilitation are demonstrable; lung transplants are more likely to be successful.

BLF COPD Project 
The British Lung Foundation’s COPD Project is a three-year project which was set up in January 2007. The aims of the project are:
 Raise awareness of chronic obstructive pulmonary disease (COPD) among the general public and health professionals.
 Facilitate the sharing of information and expertise among patients, carers, health and social care practitioners, managers, commissioners and others.
 Support the delivery of COPD campaigns and publications, developed and produced by the British Lung Foundation.

National Service Framework for COPD 
The Department of Health will be launching a new National Service Framework (NSF) for Chronic obstructive pulmonary disease towards the end of 2008. As Patient Advocate, the BLF’s Chief Executive, Helena Shovelton has been working closely with the Department of Health to support the development of the NSF for COPD.
The BLF will be working closely with patients, carers, health and social care professionals and managers to develop activities to support the implementation of the NSF for COPD. The BLF will be developing ways of seeking the views of all of its partners via face to face forum meetings, email and the web.

References

External links
British Lung Foundation website

1984 establishments in the United Kingdom
Health charities in the United Kingdom
Health in the London Borough of Islington
Lung disease organizations
Organisations based in the London Borough of Islington
Scientific organizations established in 1984